Richard Dan "Danny" Edwards (born June 14, 1951) is an American professional golfer who has played on the PGA Tour, Nationwide Tour and Champions Tour. He is the older brother of former PGA Tour player David Edwards.

Edwards was born in Ketchikan, Alaska. He started playing golf at age 14 and nearly four years later won the Oklahoma State High School Championship. He attended Oklahoma State University in Stillwater, Oklahoma and was a four-year starter on the golf team. He won the 1972 and 1973 Big Eight Conference Championships, the 1972 North and South Amateur, and was a three-time All-American. He was the lone unbeaten player on the 1973 Walker Cup team and that same year, while on his first trip to Europe, finished as the Low Amateur in the British Open.

Edwards turned professional in 1973 and joined the PGA Tour in 1975, and won five official Tour events. His first victory came at the 1977 Greater Greensboro Open – the only event he would win twice. His best finish in a major was T5 at the 1974 British Open. Edwards would earn more than three dozen top-10 finishes in Tour events; his final win came at the 1985 Pensacola Open. Two months after winning his second Greater Greensboro Open (1982), he donned a racing helmet and won the June Sprints, one of the country's most prestigious automobile races, in Elkhart Lake, Wisconsin. He is the only PGA Tour professional to accomplish the crossover victory feat in the two sports. 

In the summer of 1988, after 14 years on the PGA Tour, and never losing exempt status, Edwards stepped away from competitive golf and founded Royal Grip Inc., in Scottsdale, Arizona. The company would become its own revolution in advancing and improving perhaps the most essential piece of golf equipment.
ceomees  he turned his attention to the business world. In 1998, Edwards became CEO of GreenFix Golf, a company that manufactures a tool that enables players and maintenance crews to repair ball marks to golf greens. In 2019, he founded The Chipping Equation, a revolutionary yet simple system that is geared to helping golfers of all abilities learn and perfect one forgotten yet key segment of the game.

In April 2022, Edwards wrote his first book, DRIVEN - The Danny Edwards Story (with Bob Denney), which was published by Classics of Golf, www.ClassicsofGolf.com, Amazon, Kindle, and Apple.

Edwards lives in Wellington, Florida.

Amateur wins (2)
1972 North and South Amateur, Southeastern Amateur

Professional wins (9)

PGA Tour wins (5)

PGA Tour playoff record (1–0)

Japan Golf Tour wins (1)

Other wins (3)
1975 Oklahoma Open
1977 Oklahoma Open
1979 Oklahoma Open

Results in major championships

LA = Low amateur
CUT = Missed the half-way cut (3rd round cut in 1982 Open Championship)
"T" indicates a tie for a place

Summary

Most consecutive cuts made – 7 (1983 PGA – 1986 Masters)
Longest streak of top-10s – 1

U.S. national team appearances
Amateur
Walker Cup: 1973 (winners)

See also
1974 PGA Tour Qualifying School graduates
List of golfers with most PGA Tour wins

References

External links

American male golfers
Oklahoma State Cowboys golfers
PGA Tour golfers
PGA Tour Champions golfers
Golfers from Alaska
Golfers from Scottsdale, Arizona
People from Ketchikan, Alaska
1951 births
Living people